Cape Clear is a small town located in Victoria, Australia. Cape Clear has a hotel and a general store. The town is close to the Woady Yaloak River. The area was once vibrant during the gold rush in the 19th century with the area swamping to 25,000 people during the height of the gold rush with the local population being lower than 1,000. Cape Clear Post Office opened on 17 April 1865. and still ran and owned by the same family. It is now largely dependent on farming.

Cape Clear was named by Irish gold miners who originated from Cape Clear in Ireland. Despite its name, it is about 100 kilometres from the coast. A 13-metre-high model lighthouse with a working light was constructed near the hotel in 2008 to create a local landmark.

The Cape Clear Cast Iron Mileposts, located on Lismore-Scarsdale Road and Rokewood-Skipton Road, are listed on the Victorian Heritage Register.

The local pub, built in 1935 as a hotel and restaurant, is a local landmark and has remained relatively unchanged from its construction. The pub was recently bought by a former toll manager and ran into the ground. As of 2020 the liquor license that has been operation since its inception has expired and the pub has completely closed. The owner is now considering turning the hotel and pub into a house.

Cape Clear Primary School is a school in the area located along the main highway.

Cape Clear Community Hall is powered an off-the-grid solar system.

Cape Clear Church was sold and is in the hands of a private owner as of 2019.

Cape Clear reservoir provides water to majority of the town.

Cape Clear Cemetery is still in operation and has graves dating back to the Gold Rush.

Cape Clear CFA is a largely local crewed CFA depot with several fire engines with historical imagery present within the Cape Clear Hotel.

References

Stone, W. W. (1980). Treasury of Australian Folklore. Rigby.
Withers, W. B. (1887). The History of Ballarat. Ballarat: Niven.

Towns in Victoria (Australia)
Golden Plains Shire